Tamara Mavsar (born 1 April 1991) is a Slovenian handballer for Siófok KC and the Slovenian women's national team.

Achievements 
Slovenian First League of Handball:
Winner: 2009, 2010, 2011, 2012, 2013, 2014
Slovenian Cup:
Winner: 2009, 2010, 2011, 2012, 2013, 2014
EHF Champions League:
Finalist: 2017
Semifinalist: 2013

References

1991 births
Living people
Handball players from Ljubljana
Slovenian female handball players
Expatriate handball players
Slovenian expatriate sportspeople in North Macedonia
Mediterranean Games bronze medalists for Slovenia
Mediterranean Games medalists in handball
Competitors at the 2018 Mediterranean Games
Competitors at the 2009 Mediterranean Games